Bryndís Björgvinsdóttir (born 24 March 1982) is an Icelandic author and folklorist. She started her writing career at fifteen when she co-authored the book Orðabelgur Ormars ofurmennis (The Wordballoon of Worm Wonderman). In 2011 she published her second book, the children's book Flugan sem stöðvaði stríðið (The Fly Who Ended the War) which won the Icelandic Children's Book Prize (2011).

In 2014  she published the young adult book Hafnfirðingabrandarinn (The Local Joke) which won both the Icelandic Literary Prize (2014) and the Icelandic Women's Literature Prize (or Fjöruverðlaunin 2014).

Bryndís is an adjunct professor at Iceland Academy of the Arts.

Activism 
In 2015 Bryndís Björgvinsdóttir, Using social media, has actively encouraged the Icelandic government and Icelandic people to help out and open their homes for fleeing Syrian refugees, during the Syrian Civil War. The call for activism has indeed helped the Icelandic government to rethink their immigrant policies.

See also 

 List of Icelandic writers
 Icelandic literature

References

Living people
1982 births
Icelandic writers
Icelandic children's writers
Icelandic women writers
Icelandic women children's writers
Place of birth missing (living people)